Elections to Warwick District Council took place on Thursday 5 May 2011.

A total of 46 seats were up for election, all councillors from all wards. The previous elections produced a majority for the Conservative Party.

Election result

Ward results

2011 English local elections
2011
2010s in Warwickshire